Wainfleet  may refer to the following places:

Wainfleet, Ontario, Canada
Wainfleet All Saints, Lincolnshire, England
Wainfleet railway station
Wainfleet St Mary, Lincolnshire, England